The term Immelmann turn, named after German World War I Eindecker fighter ace Lieutnant Max Immelmann, refers to two different aircraft maneuvers. In World War I aerial combat, an Immelmann turn was a maneuver used after an attack on another aircraft to reposition the attacking aircraft for another attack. In modern aerobatics, an Immelmann turn (also known as a roll-off-the-top, or simply an Immelmann) is an aerobatic maneuver that results in level flight in the opposite direction at a higher altitude.

Historical combat maneuver

In World War I aerial combat, an Immelmann turn (named for the German air ace Max Immelmann) was a maneuver used after an attack on another aircraft to reposition the attacking aircraft for another attack.

After making a high-speed diving attack on an enemy, the attacker would then climb back up past the enemy aircraft, and just short of the stall, apply full rudder to yaw his aircraft around.  This put his aircraft facing down at the enemy aircraft, making another high-speed diving pass possible. This is a difficult maneuver to perform properly, as it involves precise control of the aircraft at low speed. With practice and proper use of all of the fighter's controls, the maneuver could be used to reposition the attacking aircraft to dive back down in any direction desired.

In modern aerobatics, this maneuver, if executed pre-stall with a non-zero turning radius at the top of the climb, is known as a wingover. If the rudder turn is executed right at the initiation of the stall, the resulting yaw occurs around a point within the aircraft's wingspan and the maneuver is known as a stall turn or hammerhead.

Aerobatic maneuver

The aerobatic Immelmann turn derives its name from the dogfighting tactic, but is a different maneuver than the original, now known as a "wingover" or "hammerhead".

In modern aerobatics, an Immelmann turn (also known as a roll-off-the-top, or simply an Immelmann) is an aerobatic maneuver. Essentially, it comprises an ascending half-loop followed by a half-roll, resulting in level flight in the opposite direction at a higher altitude. It is the opposite of a Split S, which involves a half-roll followed by a half-loop, resulting in level flight in the opposite direction at a lower altitude.

To successfully execute a roll-off-the-top turn, the pilot accelerates to sufficient airspeed to perform a loop in the aircraft. The pilot then pulls the aircraft into a climb, and continues to pull back on the controls as the aircraft climbs. Rudder and ailerons must be used to keep the half-loop straight when viewed from the ground. As the aircraft passes over the point at which the climb was commenced, it should be inverted and a half loop will have been executed. Sufficient airspeed must be maintained to recover without losing altitude, and at the top of the loop the pilot then executes a half-roll to regain normal upright aircraft orientation. As a result, the aircraft is now at a higher altitude and has changed course 180 degrees.

Not all aircraft are capable of (or certified for) this maneuver, due to insufficient engine power, or engine design that precludes flying inverted. (This usually applies to piston engines that have an open oil pan. However, when properly flown, the aircraft will maintain positive G throughout the maneuver, eliminating the requirement for an inverted oil system.) In fact, few early aircraft had sufficiently precise roll control to have performed this maneuver properly.

See also
 Chandelle
 Cuban Eight
 The Scissors
 Split S
 Thach Weave

Citations

General bibliography

External links
 The "Immelman" Turn

Aerial maneuvers